In the run up to the 2020 South Korean legislative election, various organisations carried out opinion polling to gauge voting intention in South Korea. Results of such polls are displayed in this article.

Opinion polls

Campaign period

Constituency votes

Proportional votes

Pre-campaign period

2020

2019

2018

2016 to 2017 

General notes
 Gallup Korea provides poll results only to the nearest whole number.

South Korea
Legislative elections in South Korea
Opinion polling in South Korea